Tony Terry is the self-titled second album released in 1990, by Washington, D.C.-based R&B singer Tony Terry. The album's first single, "Head over Heels", charted on the R&B singles and peaked at #13. In 1991, singles "With You" and "Everlasting Love" each peaked on the same chart at #6.

Track listing
"Head over Heels" – 5:41
"Bad Girl" – 5:11
"Baby Love" – 5:10
"Friends and Lovers" – 4:21
"With You" – 5:04
"Come Home With Me" – 5:58
"That Kind of Guy" – 4:56
"Tongue Tied" – 4:48
"Let Me Love You" – 5:01
"Read My Mind" – 4:25
"Everlasting Love" – 5:19

Charts

Singles

External links
 Tony Terry at Discogs

References

1990 albums
Epic Records albums
Tony Terry albums